= Kasumo =

Settlement in Burundi

Coordinates: 3.921°S 29.842°E

Kasumo is a small settlement in Burundi, lying to the southeast of the largest city and former capital, Bujumbura. It is one of three places in Africa to claim to be the source of the Nile, being the southernmost source of any of the river's tributaries.
